"8th of November" is a song written and recorded by American country music duo Big & Rich.  It was released in May 2006 as the third and final single from their album Comin' to Your City.  The song became the duo's seventh Top 40 hit on the Billboard Hot Country Songs charts, where it peaked at No. 18, in addition to reaching No. 94 on the Billboard Hot 100.

Content
The song, which begins with a spoken introduction by Kris Kristofferson, tells the tale of Niles Harris, a soldier in the 173rd Airborne Brigade of the United States Army during Operation Hump in South Vietnam on November 8, 1965. The intro mentions that Harris was "the guy that gave Big Kenny his top hat", and that he was among the wounded who were saved by Army medic Lawrence Joel, the first living African American to receive the Medal of Honor since the Spanish–American War of 1898.

The song is in a 6/8 time signature, and is in A mixolydian with a primary chord pattern of A–G–D–A.

Critical reception
Kevin John Coyne, reviewing the song for Country Universe, gave it a positive rating. He said the song is the best war song since "Travelin' Soldier". Stephen Thomas Erlewine, in his review of the album for Allmusic, called it "awkwardly jingoistic".

Music video
The music video was directed by Deaton-Flanigen Productions and premiered in the week of June 12, 2006. It first starts with Kristofferson saying the intro, and then cuts to the duo performing in front of a large screen, showing the visuals of Harris' life.

Awards
The song was nominated for the 2006 CMA Awards song of the year category; its music video was also nominated for video of the year categories for the CMAs, ACM Awards, and the 49th Annual Grammy Awards.

Chart performance

References

2005 songs
2006 singles
Big & Rich songs
Music videos directed by Deaton-Flanigen Productions
Songs of the Vietnam War
Songs about soldiers
Song recordings produced by John Rich
Song recordings produced by Paul Worley
Songs written by Big Kenny
Songs written by John Rich
Warner Records Nashville singles